Florin Ioan Neaga (born 12 April 1988) is a Romanian professional footballer who plays as a forward.

References

External links
 
 

1988 births
Living people
Sportspeople from Oradea
Romanian footballers
Association football forwards
Liga I players
Liga II players
CS Luceafărul Oradea players
FC Bihor Oradea players
FCV Farul Constanța players
FC Petrolul Ploiești players